The Art of Transformation is a 2006 book by former U.S. House Speaker Newt Gingrich and Nancy Desmond. It deals with American political topics.

References

2006 non-fiction books
Books by Newt Gingrich